Toyoda is the romanization of Japanese "豊田" (fertilized landfield, also romanized as Toyota). It may refer to:

People 
Fumio Toyoda (1947–2001), Japanese aikido shihan and founder of Aikido Association of America
Noriyo Toyoda (born 1967), a Japanese professional wrestler
Shirō Toyoda (1906–1977), Japanese film director
Soemu Toyoda (1885–1957), Japanese admiral of World War II
Teijirō Toyoda (1885–1961), Japanese admiral and cabinet minister in World War II
Toshiaki Toyoda (born 1969), Japanese film director
Toshihisa Toyoda (born 1940), Japanese economist
Toyoda Toru, one of the perpetrators of the Sarin gas attack on the Tokyo subway
Yohei Toyoda (born 1985), Japanese footballer
Yasumitsu Toyoda (1935-2016), Japanese Baseball Hall of Fame shortstop

Toyota Motor Corporation 

Akio Toyoda (born 1956), president of the Toyota Motor Corporation
Eiji Toyoda (1913–2013), Japanese industrialist, and largely responsible for the success of the Toyota Motor Corporation
Kiichiro Toyoda (1894–1952), creator of what was to become the Toyota Motor Corporation
Rizaburo Toyoda (1884-1952), the first president both of the Toyota Industries and Toyota Motor Corporation
Sakichi Toyoda (1867–1930), Japanese inventor and the founder of Toyota Industries Corporation Co., Ltd.
Shoichiro Toyoda (1925–2023), chairman of the Toyota Motor Corporation 1992–1999

Other uses
 Toyoda, Shizuoka, a town in Iwata District, Shizuoka, Japan
 Toyoda Machine Works

See also

Toyota (disambiguation)

Japanese-language surnames